Irina Igorevna Gubanova (1940–2000) was a Russian ballerina and film actress. She was married to the actor Sergei Gurzo.

Selected filmography

 The Girl Without an Address (1958)
 The Queen of Spades (1960) as Polina
 Man Follows the Sun (1962) as episode
 The Horizon (1962) as Vera
 713 Requests Permission to Land (1962) as young wife, American passenger
 A Trip Without a Load (1963) as doctor (uncredited)
 The First Trolleybus (1963) as Sveta Soboleva
 I Accept the Fight (1963) as Tamara
 Where Are You Now, Maxim? (1965) as Alka
 War and Peace (1965-1967, part 1-4) as Sonia Rostova
 The Green Carriage (1967) as Masha Dontsova
 The Snow Queen (1967) as Princess Elsa
 Virineya (1969) as Antonina
 The Snow Maiden (1969) as Kupava
 The Beginning (1970) as episode (uncredited)
 Dreams of Love – Liszt (1970) as Olga Janina
 Every Evening After Work (1974) as Ellochka
 Heavenly Swallows (1976) as Caroline
 Stepan's Remembrance (1977) as Nastya Yegorovna, wife of Stepan 
 A Day to Think (1980) as episode
 Woman in White (1981) as Countess Fosco
 Sicilian Defense (1981) as Yanina Stanislavovna Gronskaya (Museum expert)
 Women joke Seriously (1981) as episode
 The Eighth Wonder of the World (1982) as Chernova
 Private Life (1982) as Nelli Petrovna
 Az élet muzsikája - Kálmán Imre (1984) as nurse
 Through all the Years (1985) as episode
 Battle of Moscow (1985, TV Series) as Mother of Zoya Kosmodemyanskaya
 Complicity in Murder (1985) as Mrs. Summers
 Podróze pana Kleksa (1986) as Queen Banyaluka
 Face to Face (1987) as Jaquelin
 Horse Riders (1987) as  episode (segment "Theorist")
 The Blackmailer (1988) as Principal
 Cyrano de Bergerac (1989) as The Duenna
 Homo Novus (1990) as school principal
 Shop "Rubinchik and ..." (1992) as homeless lady (final film role)

References

Bibliography 
 Peter Cowie / Derek Elley. World Filmography: 1967. Fairleigh Dickinson University Press, 1977.

External links 
 

1940 births
2000 deaths
Deaths from pneumonia in Russia
Russian film actresses
Russian ballerinas
Soviet film actresses
Soviet ballerinas
Actresses from Saint Petersburg
20th-century Russian actresses
Burials at Serafimovskoe Cemetery
Soviet voice actresses
Russian voice actresses
Vaganova graduates